Cicero Wallace Ryan (1869 – May 2, 1944) was an American politician in the state of Washington. He served in the Washington House of Representatives from 1917 to 1931.

References

Republican Party members of the Washington House of Representatives
1869 births
1944 deaths